The Mouvement de libération nationale du Québec (MLNQ) was a secessionist group in Quebec, Canada, founded (in the wake of the 1995 referendum on Quebec sovereignty) by Front de libération du Québec (FLQ) founder, Raymond Villeneuve. The MLNQ vows to "fight until the end for Quebec independence", "intends to favour a revolutionary struggle to free the people", "intends to favour the emergence of a people's militia", and overall intends to pursue independence by "any necessary and inevitable means", according to their manifesto. Most common sightings of MLNQ occurred during Canada Day in Quebec City during the raising of the Canadian flag.

Supporters 
Supporters of the MLNQ included Pierre Falardeau (deceased 2009).

See also
Réseau de Résistance du Québécois

References
 MLNQ official website

Left-wing nationalism
Politics of Quebec
Secessionist organizations in Canada
Quebec sovereignty movement
Quebec nationalism
Republicanism in Canada
Organizations based in Montreal
Organizations established in 1995
Far-left politics in Canada
Anti-English sentiment